Ian McKellen is an English stage and screen actor. He is the recipient of seven Laurence Olivier Awards, a Tony Award, a Golden Globe Award, two Academy Award nominations, four BAFTA nominations and five Emmy Award nominations. McKellen's work spans genres ranging from Shakespearean and modern theatre to popular fantasy and science fiction. His notable film roles include Gandalf in The Lord of the Rings and The Hobbit trilogies, Magneto in the X-Men films, Sir Leigh Teabing in The Da Vinci Code (2006), Sherlock Holmes in Mr. Holmes (2015) and Cogsworth in the live-action adaptation of Beauty and the Beast (2017).

Theatre

Filmography

Film

Television

Video games

Music
 In 1987, McKellen appeared reciting Shakespeare while rock group The Fleshtones improvised behind him on Andy Warhol's Fifteen Minutes which ran on MTV.
 Vampire in the music video "Heart" by Pet Shop Boys
 The man who's "falling out of reach" in the music video "Falling Out of Reach" by Guillemots
 Appears on the Scissor Sisters track "Invisible Light" from their 2010 album Night Work, reciting a passage regarding the "Invisible Light" of the title.
 Appeared as himself alongside George Ezra in the latter's music video for "Listen to the Man". Whilst Ezra is singing his song, McKellen joins in and lip-syncs Ezra's voice.

Music videos

Audiobooks
 Audiobook narrator of Michelle Paver's series Wolf Brother, Spirit Walker, Soul Eater, Outcast, Oath Breaker, and Ghost Hunter, as well as a version of Homer's Odyssey.

References

Sources

External links 

Male actor filmographies
British filmographies